Poļina Rožkova (born 12 October 1985 in Riga) is a Latvian wheelchair fencer and wheelchair curler from Riga.

Career
As a wheelchair fencer she competed on 2016 Summer Paralympics in Women's Individual Épée Category A event and finished on sixth place in Pool 1.

At the national wheelchair curling level, she is a seven-time Latvian champion curler.

Wheelchair curling teams

Mixed doubles

References

External links 

 
 
 Video: 

Living people
Place of birth missing (living people)
Latvian female curlers
Latvian wheelchair curlers
Latvian curling champions
Paralympic wheelchair fencers of Latvia
Wheelchair fencers at the 2016 Summer Paralympics
Paralympic wheelchair curlers of Latvia
Wheelchair curlers at the 2022 Winter Paralympics
1985 births
21st-century Latvian women